The Apostolic Vicariate of Gambella (formerly the Apostolic Prefecture of Gambella) is a Catholic missionary pre-diocesan jurisdiction (known as an apostolic vicariate) in the western part of Ethiopia.

It is exempt, i.e. immediately dependent upon the Holy See (notably the Roman Congregation for the Evangelization of Peoples), not part of any ecclesiastical province (such as the Metropolitan Archbishopric of Addis Abbeba). 

Its cathedral episcopal see is the St. Joseph Cathedral, in Gambela.

The Apostolic Vicariate of Gambella comprises all the Gambella Region and large part of Illubabor Zone in Oromia Region.

History 
On 16 November 2000 it was established as Apostolic prefecture of Gambella, on territory split-off from the Apostolic Prefecture of Jimma–Bonga, the only other one in Ethiopia observing the Roman rite (like all five Apostolic vicariates in the predominantly Coptic country).
 
On 5 December 2009 it was promoted an apostolic vicariate, since entitled to a titular bishop.

Ordinaries 
(Roman Rite, so far missionary members of a Latin congregation)

Apostolic Prefect of Gambella 
 Fr. Angelo Moreschi, Salesians (S.D.B.), (2000.11.16 – 2009.12.05 see below)

Apostolic Vicars of Gambella 
 Angelo Moreschi, S.D.B., (see above 2009.12.05 – 2020.03.25), Titular Bishop of Elephantaria in Mauretania (2009.12.05 – 2020.03.25)

See also 
 Roman Catholicism in Ethiopia

References

Sources and external links
 GCatholic.org with incumbent bio links 
 map of the Ethiopian church on its website

Apostolic vicariates
Catholicism in Ethiopia
Apostolic Vicariate Gambella